The secretary of state of Puerto Rico leads all efforts that promote the cultural, political, and economical relations between Puerto Rico and foreign countries, and other jurisdictions of the United States. The post was created by Article IV of the Constitution of Puerto Rico which merely establishes that the secretary serves as acting governor when the governor is unable to perform his duties—a post similar to that of a lieutenant governor in U.S. politics. In recent times, however, the post has evolved into one similar to that of a foreign minister. Today, the secretary is the officer in charge of Puerto Rico's foreign relations, albeit under the consent of Congress or the U.S. Department of State due to Puerto Rico's political status.

Administratively, the post differs to other similar titles in U.S. politics. Namely, that in contrast to lieutenant governors, the secretary is not elected by the people. He is instead appointed by the governor with advice and consent from both the Senate and House of Representatives. In addition, the secretary does not have any role whatsoever in the state legislature, in contrast to lieutenant governors. Unlike secretaries of state in other U.S. jurisdictions, the secretary of state of Puerto Rico does not take part in the elections process. That responsibility falls into the State Commission on Elections.

Yet, the post does have some similarities to other U.S. secretaries of state. For example, the secretary of state of Puerto Rico is also the chief clerk of the commonwealth and the primary custodian of important records. The secretary promulgates all Puerto Rican laws after the governor signs them and keeps records of them online and offline. They also keeps record of business charters, professional licenses, trademarks, and other documents. Civil acts like marriage licenses, birth certificates, and adoption and divorce decrees, however, are kept in record by the Department of Health of Puerto Rico.  Other historical documents are kept in the General Archives of Puerto Rico, a program of the Institute of Puerto Rican Culture.

In summary, the secretary of state of Puerto Rico is, by law, the chief clerk, the acting governor, and the officer in charge of the commonwealth's foreign relations. Because of these responsibilities, the post is typically occupied by a highly competent individual with some degree of veterancy, starting with Roberto Sánchez Vilella in 1952. This cadre has led citizens and politicians alike to hold secretaries of state in high esteem regardless of their political affiliation.

Appointment and gubernatorial succession

The secretary of state is first in line to exercise the role of acting governor when the governor of Puerto Rico is temporarily unavailable, whether because of being away from Puerto Rico or due to another temporary incapacity.  The secretary of state is the only official who can automatically become governor if the elected governor is permanently incapable of remaining in office due to death, resignation, or conviction as part of an impeachment process.  Prior to the adoption of the local constitution, the Foraker Act of 1900 and the Jones-Shafroth Act of 1917 provided for the position of executive secretary, who carried out the roles assigned to contemporary secretaries of state.

Since 1952, secretaries of state have been appointed by the governor, subject to the advice and consent of both the Senate of Puerto Rico and the House of Representatives of Puerto Rico.  A secretary of state appointed by the governor while the legislative assembly is in recess may take office as a recess appointment and serve until the nomination is rejected by any of the legislative chambers or the next legislative regular session ends, whichever happens first.

Additional delegated duties
Secretaries of state of the United States Commonwealth of Puerto Rico, in addition to heading the State Department, one of the smallest central government agencies, and exercising the role as the territory's lieutenant governor, are usually assigned additional functions by the governor.  For example, Gov. Luis Muñoz Marín had Secretary of State Roberto Sánchez Vilella, a civil engineer, serve simultaneously as Secretary of Public Works.  Gov. Pedro Rosselló had Secretary of State Norma Burgos serve for several years as chair of the Puerto Rico Planning Board.  Gov. Aníbal Acevedo Vilá's second secretary of state, Fernando Bonilla, also served as executive director of the Puerto Rico Ports Authority.  However, perhaps no other secretary of state has been assigned more tasks than former Secretary of State Kenneth McClintock, who served as chair of the incoming Fortuño administration's Incoming Committee on Government Transition, coordinated the government's digital TV transition work group, headed the state government's Census 2010 team, chaired the government's 2010 Central and Caribbean Games Coordinating Committee, was tasked with making the final awards of Public-Private Partnership contracts, chaired the Government Reorganization Committee and chaired the Outgoing Transition Committee, among other assignments delegated by Gov. Luis Fortuño.  Governor Alejandro García Padilla put his first appointee, secretary Bernier in charge of evaluating the Luis Muñoz Marín International Airport Public-Private Partnership contract and overseeing social agencies, such as the Health, Family Services, Education and Sports and Recreation departments.  He has appointed current Secretary Suárez as  chairman of his administration's fiscal team, a role he played previously as Chief of Staff to the Governor.

The secretary of state of Puerto Rico is a member of the National Association of Secretaries of State, as well as the National Lieutenant Governors Association in his dual role as head of Puerto Rico's Department of State, as well as the islands' lieutenant governor.

Traditionally, gubernatorial inaugural ceremonies are initiated by the outgoing administration's secretary of state who, prior to the ceremonial swearing-in of the new governor, will turn over the master of ceremonies role to the secretary of state–designate, symbolizing the orderly transition from one administration to another.

Turn-over
Secretaries of state of Puerto Rico, once confirmed by both houses of the Legislature, do not serve for a fixed term but at the pleasure of the governor.  Over 68 years, the U.S. territory has had 30 individuals serve in that position, for an average 2.2 years in service.  However, if the 12-year term of the first secretary, Gov. Muñoz-Marín's only one is not taken into account, the average length of Sec. Sánchez-Vilella's successors falls to only 1.8 years.

After Sánchez-Vilella's 12 years in office, Puerto Rico's second-longest serving secretary of state was Norma Burgos under Gov. Pedro Rosselló, with Gov. Luis Ferré's sole appointee, Sec. Chardón, and Gov. Luis Fortuño's sole appointee, Sec. McClintock, tying for third longest serving.

List of secretaries

Notes

References

External links

www.estado.pr.gov - official site 

Council of Secretaries of Puerto Rico
 
Secretary of State